Jon Jørundson Mannsåker (28 September 1880 – 28 February 1964) was a Norwegian priest and politician for the Liberal Party.

Biography
He was born at  Odda in Hordaland, Norway. He took an education in theology. He was the headmaster of Hardanger folk high school (Hardanger folkehøgskule) from 1912 to 1928, and at the same time an auxiliary priest in Ullensvang from 1914. In 1928 he became a curate in Voss.
 In 1933 he moved permanently to Oslo to become a curate there. From 1940 to 1950 he served as vicar.

He was elected to the Norwegian Parliament in 1927 and 1930, representing the constituency Hordaland and the Liberal Party.
He was a deputy representative to the Norwegian Parliament during the term 1954–1957. He was a minor ballot candidate in the 1957 election.

He was  married to Anna Erika Stueland (1881–1966). They were the parents of politician Bergfrid Fjose and historian Dagfinn Mannsåker.

References

1880 births
1964 deaths
People from Odda
Norwegian priest-politicians
Norwegian educators
Members of the Storting
Liberal Party (Norway) politicians
Hordaland politicians
Politicians from Oslo